Ashihara (written: 芦原) is a Japanese surname. Notable people with the surname include:

, Japanese karate school master
Ashihara kaikan, a school and style of karate founded by Hideyuki Ashihara
, Japanese manga artist
, Japanese architect
, Japanese businessman

See also
Ashihara no Nakatsukuni, in Japanese mythology, the world between Takamagahara (Heaven) and Yomi (Hell)

Japanese-language surnames